Hans Klug (born 16 February 1938) is a Swiss diver. He competed in the men's 3 metre springboard event at the 1960 Summer Olympics.

References

External links
 
 

1938 births
Living people
Swiss male divers
Olympic divers of Switzerland
Divers at the 1960 Summer Olympics
Place of birth missing (living people)
20th-century Swiss people